Richard Wesley Manville (December 31, 1925 – February 13, 2019) was an American professional baseball pitcher. He played parts of two seasons in Major League Baseball, for the Boston Braves in 1950 and the Chicago Cubs in 1952. He was born in Des Moines, Iowa and attended Yale University before serving in WWII, and Harvard University after. He lettered in basketball, baseball, ice hockey and soccer. He was listed at a height of 6 feet, 4 inches and a weight of 192 pounds. He batted and threw right-handed. Manville died February 13, 2019.

References

External links

Major League Baseball pitchers
Boston Braves players
Chicago Cubs players
Evansville Braves players
Milwaukee Brewers (minor league) players
Hartford Chiefs players
Los Angeles Angels (minor league) players
Shreveport Sports players
New Orleans Pelicans (baseball) players
Denver Bears players
Baseball players from Des Moines, Iowa
1925 births
2019 deaths
United States Navy personnel of World War II
Yale Bulldogs baseball players
Harvard Crimson baseball players